Suburban Tribe was a Finnish rock/metal band. The band is notable for containing the members of two of Finland's best known thrash metal bands, Stone and Airdash. Bassist Janne Joutsenniemi played in the band Stone and guitarist Roope Siren played in Airdash.  

In the beginning, the band's name was typed Sub-Urban Tribe, but it was changed to its present shape after a short break in 2001.  The band got some publicity from TV series Big Brother. Their song "While the World Awaits" was played as theme song in season 2006.
It was announced in March 2011 that the band has decided to disband.

Band members

Final lineup 

 Ville Tuomi – lead vocals (2000–2011)
 Roope Sirén – guitar (1994–2011)
 Janne Joutsenniemi – bass (1994–2011)
 Alec Hirst-Gee – drums (1994–2011)
 Euge Valovirta – guitar (2006–2011)

Former members 

 Jouni Markkanen – lead vocals (1994–2000)
 Emerson Burton – keyboards (1997–2001), also ex-HIM

Discography

Albums 

 1994 	Primitive
 1995 	Purity
 1997 	Panorama
 1998    Prime Time Collection
 1998 	Elektro 57
 2001 	Suburban Tribe
 2004 	Manimal
 2006 	Revolt Now!
 2007    Recollection
 2010    Now and Ever After
 2011    Suburban Tribe (remaster/reissue)

Singles 

 "Silence" (1994)
 "To and Fro" (1994)
 "One of My Little Memories" (1995)
 "Impossible" (1997)
 "First Spring Day" (1997)
 "Frequency" (1997)
 "Watching You" (2001)
 "Frozen Ashes" (2001)
 "Oil and Water" (2001)
 "Perfect Dark" (2002)
 "Untameable" (2003)
 "Silent Rain" (2004)
 "Nothingness" (2006)
 "Complications" (2006)
 "Nevermore" (2006)
 "While the World Awaits (2006)
 "Shock the Monkey" (2007)
 "Now and Ever After" (2010)

References 

Finnish heavy metal musical groups